Neustadt is one of the inner-city districts of the Free and Hanseatic City of Hamburg, Germany.

History 

By 1529, Hamburg was firmly anchored in Lutheran Reformation and had successfully managed to divert its trade away from the Baltic to more dynamic markets along the Atlantic. Hamburg's economy boomed, between 1526 and 1551 the state budget tripled, and the Hanseatic city had become a major trade and capital market. Meanwhile, persecution of Protestants in the Low Countries, other parts of Germany, Portugal, Spain and various other parts of Europe caused an immense influx of religious refugees into Hamburg. Between 1500 and 1600, the population of Hamburg tripled to 40,000, surpassing Lübeck as largest German port city.

In advance of the Thirty Years' War (1618–1648), the Hamburg Senate commissioned Dutch military engineer Johan van Valckenburgh to strengthen the city's defenses. The new Hamburg Ramparts (Wallanlagen) were also meant to meet demand for additional space to be within the city. When completed in 1626, the ramparts enclosed all of Altstadt, plus an almost equally large area west of it: the so-called Neustadt.

Neustadt was laid out in a mostly rectangular street grid, though not much of that is recognizable today. Additionally, three principal streets connected the old town (Alstadt) east of the Alster River with the two new city-gates out west. Each of these three streets was given a market square at half distance: Gänsemarkt in the northern Neustadt, Schaarmarkt in the southern Neustadt, and Großneumarkt in the very center. The northern Neustadt around Gänsemarkt became a quarter of the wealthy and well-off citizens. Later this area also developed into Hamburg's opera district, the area around Jungfernstieg eventually developed into an elegant shopping district. In contrast, many parts of the southern Neustadt became shady quarters of the port's workers. Up until the late 19th and early 20th century, Neustadt was famous for its many "Gängeviertel": quarters with narrow alleys (Low German: Gänge). In 1893 Neustadt was ravaged by a Cholera epidemic. Due to continuing, unsustainable hygienic conditions, by the 1960s most of the Gängeviertel were demolished.

Geography 
Neustadt is bordered by Binnenalster and Alster (i.e. Alsterfleet) to the East, Elbe to the South, and the former Wallanlagen (now made up by a string of parks) to the West and North-west; among those: Planten un Blomen. Except for the blocks around Fleetinsel and the Alster's canals in the eastern part of the district, most of Neustadt lies on a geest slope above the Elbe. Districts bordering Neustadt are (starting clockwise in the West/North-west): St. Pauli, Rotherbaum, Altstadt and HafenCity.

Subdivisions 

For statistical and planning purposes, Neustadt has four designated localities (German: Ortsteile) and quarters (German: Viertel, or specifically used in Hamburg: Quartier); however not recognized as administrative subdivisions.

Streets and squares 
On its western and north-western borders, Neustadt is encircled by "Ring 1" (Holstenwall, Gorch-Fock-Wall, Esplanade), an 1880s-built ring road continuing into Altstadt. Ludwig-Erhard-Straße is a 1960s-built thoroughfare and part of Bundesstraße 4, crossing Neustadt midway from East to West.

Other notable streets are most of the shopping streets around Jungfernstieg and Gänsemarkt, and a couple of streets between St. Michaelis and the Elbe's embankment at Baumwall and Vorsetzen. Important squares in Neustadt include Johannes-Brahms-Platz, Gänsemarkt, Großneumarkt, Millerntorplatz, Schaarmarkt, Sievekingplatz, Stephansplatz, and Zeughausmarkt.

Culture

Landmarks and cultural heritage 
Like neighboring Altstadt, Neustadt is packed with landmarks and cultural heritage.

The single most important landmark in Neustadt is the Church of St. Michaelis (St. Michael's), one of Hamburg's five Lutheran main-churches (Hauptkirchen). St. Michaelis became Neustadt's Lutheran parish in 1647, however only granted political rights in 1677, and permitted as college to the city's parliament in 1685. Other notable churches in Neustadt include four Nordic missions to seafarers: the Danish Seamen's Church Abroad (Benedikte), the Finnish Seamen's Mission, the Norwegian Church Abroad, and the Church of Sweden Abroad (Gustav Adolf), and the Anglican Church of England (St. Thomas Becket).

Up until the late 19th and early 20th century, Neustadt was famous for its many "Gängeviertel": quarters with narrow alleys (Low German: Gänge). However, due to unsustainable hygienic conditions, by the 1960s most of them were demolished. The Krameramtsstuben (Grocers' Apartments) are one of a few preserved examples of that time. At Rademachergang stands a fountain, dedicated to Hans Hummel (1787–1854), a former water carrier and one of Hamburg's beloved "Original(e)" (character(s)).

The Alsterarkaden is an open arcade, spanning some 200 m along the entire North-west side of Kleine Alster. Designed by Alexis de Chateauneuf (1799–1853) and built in the year after the Great Fire (1842), it was one of the first buildings in the redeveloped urban ensemble between Jungfernstieg and Rathausmarkt. Today they are center of the Passagenviertel.

The Hanseatic Higher Regional Court (HansOLG) was founded in 1879 as the common supreme court of the three Hanseatic and republican city-states of Bremen (part of HansOLG until 1947), Hamburg (sole user today) and Lübeck (part of HansOLG until 1937). The courthouse at Wallanlagen was built between 1907 and 1912.

The Hübner Haus, an office building and former marzipan factory, café, and pastry shop, was the first concrete building erected in Hamburg when completed in 1909.

Museums and cultural institutions 

 Museums
 Hamburg Museum
 Cap San Diego – Museum ship
 Rickmer Rickmers – Museum ship
 Music and performing arts venues
 State Opera (Staatsoper)
 Laeiszhalle
 Fliegende Bauten
 Opernloft

References

External links 

  
 Images on bilderbuch-hamburg.de 

Hamburg-Neustadt
Hamburg-Mitte